Talazhsky aviagorodok is a rural locality (a settlement) in Arkhangelsk city of republic significance, Arkhangelsk Oblast, Russia. The population was 3,298 as of 2010.

Geography 
Talazhsky aviagorodok is located 14 km northeast of Arkhangelsk (the district's administrative centre) by road. Arkhangelsk is the nearest rural locality.

References 

Rural localities in Arkhangelsky City